North London is the northern part of London, England, north of the River Thames. It extends from Clerkenwell and Finsbury, on the edge of the City of London financial district, to Greater London's boundary with Hertfordshire.

The term north London is used to differentiate the area from south London, east London and west London. Some parts of north London are also part of Central London. There is a Northern postal area, but this includes some areas not normally described as part of north London, while excluding many others that are.

Development
The first northern suburb developed in the Soke of Cripplegate in the early twelfth century, but London's growth beyond its Roman northern gates was slower than in other directions, partly because of the marshy ground north of the wall and also because the roads through those gates were less well connected than elsewhere. The parishes that would become north London were almost entirely rural until the Victorian period. Many of these parishes were grouped into an area called the Finsbury division.

In the early 19th century, the arrival of the Regent's Canal in Islington and St Pancras stimulated London's northerly expansion, continuing when the development of the railway network accelerated urbanisation, promoting economic growth in the capital and allowing for the establishment of commuter suburbs.

This trend continued in the twentieth century and was reinforced by motorcar-based commuting until the establishment of the Metropolitan Green Belt, shortly after the Second World War, prevented London from expanding any further.

Formal uses

Planning Policy sub-region

The 2011 iteration of the London Plan included an altered 'North' sub-region, to be used for planning, engagement, resource allocation and progress reporting purposes. It consists of the London Boroughs of Barnet, Haringey and Enfield. 
The 2004-2008 and 2008-2011 versions of the London Plan sub-regions varied in their composition.

North Thames: Boundary Commission report
In 2017, the government asked the Boundary Commission for England to reconsider the boundaries of parliamentary constituencies. The Commission's approach was to start with existing regions of England (in this case London) and then group the local authorities within that area into sub-regions for further sub-division.

The North Thames sub-region includes all parts of London lying north of the river; the 19 boroughs which lie wholly north of the river, plus parts of cross-river Richmond upon Thames.

An earlier 2013 study, whose recommendations were not adopted, took a different approach by assigning all of Richmond to the south.
This list includes all boroughs included in the North Thames area:

Football:  North London Derby

In English football, the teams Arsenal and Spurs are considered the two North London teams and the games against each other are known as North London Derbies.

It has been described as "one of the fiercest derbies in English football and one that separates families in north London."  

The League matches in the English Premier League and formerly the Football League are known formally as the North London Derby.  To date, 167 have been contested with 66 wins for Arsenal, 54 wins for Spurs and 47 draws.  In other matches, simply referred to generically as North London Derbies, the 6 FA cup contests resulted in 4 Arsenal victories to Spurs' 2  with no draws, while the 14 League Cup matches have ended with 7 wins for the Arsenal against 4 for Spurs with 3 draws.  In the sole Charity Shield between the two clubs, then exclusively between the previous season's league champions and the FA Cup winners, the contest in 1991 was drawn with the Shield shared.  Spurs had won the FA cup final in 1991 after beating Arsenal 3-1 in the semi-final, the first FA cup semi-final and the first of five North London Derbies to be held at Wembley Stadium. The 1991 Charity Shield is the sole occasion so far in which a trophy has been at stake, though in 1971 (0-1) and 2004 (2-2) Arsenal were crowned league champions at the final whistle of the North London Derby in Tottenham.

Climate

North London has, like other parts of London and the UK in general, a temperate maritime climate according to the Köppen climate classification system. Long term climate observations dating back to 1910 are available for Hampstead, which is also the most elevated Weather Station in the London area, at 137m. This both hilltop and urban position means severe frosts are rare.

Temperatures increase towards the Thames, firstly because of the urban warming effect of the surrounding area, but secondly due to altitude decreasing towards the river, meaning some of the hillier northern margins of North London are often a degree or so cooler than those areas adjacent to the Thames. Occasionally snow can be seen to lie towards the Chilterns while central London is snow-free.

On average 35.8 nights will report an air frost, some 119 days of the year will register at least 1mm of precipitation, and on 7.4 days a cover of snow will be observed. All annual averages refer to the observation period 1971–2000.

Associated organisations

 North London derby
 North London Central Mosque
 North London Collegiate School
 North London Lions
 North London Line
 North London Skolars
 University of North London

See also 
 Central London
 East London
 Inner London
 Outer London
 South London
 West London

References

External links

 
 

London sub-regions
Areas of London
Geography of London